The Occult Reich is a 1974 book about occultism during the Third Reich by J. H. Brennan.

See also
 Zodiac and Swastika

References

 A History of Nazi Involvement with the Occult by Peter Levenda
 Secret Aryan Cults and Their Influence on Nazi Ideology by Nicholas Goodrick-Clarke

1974 non-fiction books
Books about Nazism
English-language books
English non-fiction books
Occultism in Nazism
Occult books